Odin is an EP by Japanese heavy metal band Loudness. It was released in Japan in 1985, with and without the instrumental tracks. All tracks on the EP were included on the soundtrack of the Japanese anime film Odin: Photon Sailer Starlight, released that same year.

Track listing 
All music by Akira Takasaki, and all lyrics by Minoru Niihara.

Personnel 
Loudness
 Minoru Niihara – vocals
 Akira Takasaki – guitars
 Masayoshi Yamashita – bass
 Munetaka Higuchi – drums

Additional musicians
 Masanori Sasaji – keyboards

Production
 Masahiro Miyasawa – engineer

References 

1985 debut EPs
Loudness (band) albums
Columbia Records EPs
Norse mythology in music